Receivers is the fourth full-length release from Parts & Labor, released in 2008 on Jagjaguwar Records.

Track listing
"Satellites"
"Nowheres Nigh"
"Mount Misery"
"Little Ones"
"The Ceasing Now"
"Wedding In A Wasteland"
"Prefix Free"
"Solemn Show World"

Reception

Pitchfork Media (8.1/10) 22 October 2008

2008 albums
Parts & Labor albums